André Soares (born 13 February 1984) is a Brazilian handball player for HC Taubaté and the Brazilian handball team. He won a gold medal at the 2015 Pan American Games and competed at the 2016 Olympics.

Titles
South and Central American Men's Club Handball Championship:
2019
Pan American Men's Club Handball Championship:
 2013, 2014, 2015, 2016, 2018
 Campeonato Paulista de Handebol Masculino:
 2015
 Liga Nacional Masculina
 2013, 2014, 2016 
 Jogos Abertos do Interior
 2014
 Jogos Regionais
 2010, 2011, 2012, 2013, 2014, 2015
 Aquece Rio
 2016

Individual awards and achievements
2017 Pan American Men's Club Handball Championship: Best left wing

References

1984 births
Living people
Brazilian male handball players
Olympic handball players of Brazil
Handball players at the 2016 Summer Olympics
Handball players at the 2015 Pan American Games
Pan American Games medalists in handball
Pan American Games gold medalists for Brazil
Medalists at the 2015 Pan American Games
21st-century Brazilian people